This is a list of Albanian football transfers for the 2015 summer transfer window by club. Only transfers of clubs in the Albanian Superliga are included.

The summer transfer window was open on 1 June 2015, although a few transfers take place prior to that date. The window was closed at midnight on 31 August 2015. Players without a club may join one at any time, either during or in between transfer windows.

Superliga

Bylis Ballsh

In:

Out:

Flamurtari Vlorë

In:

 

 
 
 
 

Out:

FK Kukësi

In:

Out:

KF Laçi

In:

Out:

Partizani Tirana

In:

Out:

Skënderbeu Korçë

In:

Out:

Teuta Durrës

In:

Out:

KF Tirana

In:

Out:

Tërbuni Pukë

In:

 

Out:

Vllaznia Shkodër

In:

Out:

References

External links
 Footballdatabase.eu

Albania
Trans
2015